Mufti Abdul Hannan (died 12 April 2017) was a Bangladeshi terrorist and the chief of Harkat-ul-Jihad al-Islami Bangladesh. He was sentenced to death by hanging for multiple crimes and executed on 12 April 2017.

Career 
Hannan is thought to have fought in the Afghan war against the Soviet Union. He trained in Peshwar, Pakistan and spent six months in a seminary in Uttar Pradesh, India. He was the chief of the Bangladeshi branch of Harkat-ul-Jihad al-Islami. He was arrested on 1 October 2005.

Death 
Hannan was hanged at approximately 10:00 p.m. local time on 12 April 2017 in Kashimpur Prison for the attempt to kill the British High Commissioner through bombing the Shah Jalal Shrine.

Militant activity
Planned the 1999 bombing of an Udichi Cultural event in Jessore Bangladesh. He admitted his role after his arrest and called the bombing a success.
Involved in 2001 Ramna Batamul bombings. He was sentenced to death in 2014.
Indicted in the 2001 bombing of Communist Party of Bangladesh rally. 
Involved in the attempt to kill the British High Commissioner through bombing the Shah jalal shrine. He was sentenced to death. 
Planned 21 August bombing at Awami League rally.

References

2017 deaths
Bangladeshi Islamists
Sunni Islamists
Mujahideen members of the Soviet–Afghan War
Bangladeshi male criminals
People executed by Bangladesh by hanging
Executed Bangladeshi people
Year of birth missing
People convicted of attempted murder
Leaders of Islamic terror groups